Ohlin Island or Bailys Island is an island lying  west of the north end of Tower Island in the Palmer Archipelago. Ohlin Island was discovered by the Swedish Antarctic Expedition (1901–1904) and named by Otto Nordenskiöld for Axel Ohlin, zoologist with the expedition.

See also
 Composite Antarctic Gazetteer
 List of Antarctic islands south of 60° S
 Physeter Rocks
 SCAR
 Territorial claims in Antarctica

References

Islands of the Palmer Archipelago